Virginia (1873) is an opera in four acts with music by Venezuelan composer José Ángel Montero and libretto, in Italian, by Domenico Bancalari. It is believed to be the first opera ever composed in Venezuela, and was first performed in the Teatro Caracas on April 26, 1873. The plot of the opera deals with despotic power and social injustice.

In 1969, the opera was revived in the Teatro Municipal de Caracas with the soprano Fedora Alemán in the title role. Later it was recorded, and revived again in July 2003, in a setting by the Compañía Nacional de Ópera Alfredo Sadel and the Teresa Carreño Cultural Complex, with Elizabeth Almenar, Cayito Aponte and Amelia Salazar in the principal roles.

1969 recording
 Virginia: Fedora Alemán
 Claudio: Ramón Iriarte
 Icilio: Blas Martínez
 Marcos: Alfredo Izquierdo
 Virginio: Danilo Van der Hahn
 Emilia: Yolanda Correa
 Chorus of the Escuela Nacional de Ópera
 Orquesta Sinfónica de Venezuela
 Conductor: Primo Casale
 Fundación Vicente Emilio Sojo, Número de catálogo: CD20101 // CD20102

Sources

 José Ángel Montero y su ópera Virginia (José Ángel Montero and his opera Virginia) (in Spanish), Felipe Sangiorgi. Analysis, synopsis and libretto.

See also 
Venezuelan culture

Operas
1873 operas
Venezuelan music
Italian-language operas
Operas by José Ángel Montero